Three ships of the United States Navy have been named Birmingham, after the city of Birmingham, Alabama.

 , was a light cruiser in service from 1908 to 1923.
 , was a light cruiser commissioned in 1943, involved in heavy fighting in the Pacific War, and decommissioned in 1946.
 , was a Los Angeles-class nuclear attack submarine in service from 1978 to 1997.

See also

References

United States Navy ship names